Volume Seven, Volume VII, Volume 7 or Vol 7 may refer to:

 Volume 7, a 2008 album by Brazilian rock band Violeta de Outono
 Volume 7, a 2001 album by Kim Jong Kook
 Volumes 7 & 8, a 2001 album by The Desert Sessions
 Volume Seven, compilation in the Volume magazine series, July 1993

See also
 Volume 7: Gypsy Marches, a 2001 album by The Desert Sessions